Michalis Giannitsis (born 6 February 1992) is a Greek professional footballer who plays as a defender for Super League 2 club Apollon Larissa.

Career

Aris
He started his career in youth teams of Aris. In 2011, head coach Sakis Tsiolis promoted him to the first team, and he made his professional debut on 26 August 2012, in a Supeleague game against Panionios.

Trikala
On 12 July 2017, he joined Trikala of the Football League.

Iraklis
On 2 January 2018, Iraklis officially announced the signing of Giannitsis on a free transfer. At the end of the season he celebrated promotion to the Football League.

References

External links
 

1992 births
Living people
Aris Thessaloniki F.C. players
Kallithea F.C. players
PGS Kissamikos players
A.E. Sparta P.A.E. players
Trikala F.C. players
Iraklis Thessaloniki F.C. players
Olympiacos Volos F.C. players
Apollon Larissa F.C. players
Super League Greece players
Football League (Greece) players
Gamma Ethniki players
Super League Greece 2 players
Greek footballers
Association football defenders
Footballers from Thessaloniki